Alain Bergeron (born February 11, 1950) is a Québécois science fiction author and political scientist.

Born in Paris, France, he has won the Prix Aurora Award and Sidewise Award for Alternate History. He has written seven books, beginning with Un été de Jessica (1978). Bergeron is also an essayist who writes works concerning the genre. With Laurine Spehner, he co-wrote a work about The X-Files.

References

External links

1950 births
Canadian science fiction writers
Canadian alternative history writers
Sidewise Award winners
Living people